Pinke may refer to:

 Pinke (color), a shade of yellow
 Robert Pinke (1573-1647), English clergyman

See also

 Pink (disambiguation)
 Pinki (disambiguation)
 Pinkie (disambiguation)
 Pinky (disambiguation)